Pheidochloa is a genus of Australian and Papuasian plants in the grass family.

Species
Pheidochloa gracilis S.T.Blake - New Guinea, Queensland, Northern Territory, Western Australia
Pheidochloa vulpioides Veldkamp - New Guinea

References

Micrairoideae
Poaceae genera